Sanvel Lau Chi Keung (born 7 January 1977) is a Hong Kong former professional football player and the current assistant coach of Hong Kong Premier League club Tai Po.

Managerial career
Lau retired from football after the 2015-16 season and took over as manager of Sun Hei. In his first season as manager, he led the club to the 2016–17 Hong Kong First Division title.

Honours

Club
Double Flower
 Hong Kong First Division League: 1995–96
 Viceroy Cup: 1995–96
 Hong Kong FA Cup: 1996–97

Sun Hei
 Hong Kong First Division: 2001–02, 2003–04, 2004–05, 2016–17
 Hong Kong Senior Shield: 2004–05
 Hong Kong FA Cup: 2002–03, 2004–05, 2005–06
 Hong Kong League Cup: 2002–03, 2004–05, 2005–06

Kam Fung
 Hong Kong Second Division: 2011–12

Yuen Long
 Hong Kong Second Division: 2012–13

References

External links
 Lau Chi Keung at HKFA
 Profile at convoysunhei.hk 

1977 births
Living people
Hong Kong footballers
Hong Kong international footballers
Association football midfielders
Sun Hei SC players
Hong Kong First Division League players
Yuen Long FC players
Hong Kong League XI representative players